Rui Filipe Cunha Correia (born 10 June 1995), known as Nené, is a Portuguese professional footballer who plays as a midfielder for Jagiellonia Białystok.

Football career
On 31 August 2014, Nené  made his professional debut with Braga B in a 2014–15 Segunda Liga match against Farense.

On 11 June 2019 he signed a 3-year contract with Primeira Liga club Santa Clara.

References

External links

Stats and profile at 90minut.pl 

Stats and profile at LPFP 

1995 births
Living people
People from the Azores
Portuguese footballers
Portugal youth international footballers
Association football midfielders
S.C. Braga B players
AD Fafe players
C.D. Santa Clara players
Jagiellonia Białystok players
Primeira Liga players
Liga Portugal 2 players
Campeonato de Portugal (league) players
Ekstraklasa players
Portuguese expatriate footballers
Expatriate footballers in Poland
Portuguese expatriate sportspeople in Poland